Kouř is a Czech comedy film directed by Tomáš Vorel.

Cast
Jan Slovák - Miroslav Čáp
Lucie Zedníčková - Kotě
Jaroslav Dušek - Karel Šmíd
Jiří Fero Burda - Béďa
Martin Faltýn - Glosner
Šimon Caban - Arnoštek
Eva Holubová - Liduška Běhalová

External links
 
 Entry in Czech film database

Czechoslovak comedy films
1991 comedy films
1991 films
Czech comedy films
1990s Czech-language films